The 1943–44 Army Cadets men's basketball team represented the United States Military Academy (known as "Army" for their sports teams) during the 1943–44 intercollegiate basketball season in the United States. The head coach was Ed Kelleher, coaching in his first season with the Cadets. The team finished the season with a 15–0 record and was retroactively named the national champion by the Helms Athletic Foundation and the Premo-Porretta Power Poll. The Helms and NCAA Division I Tournament champions were the same except for 1939, 1940, 1944, and 1954 when Oregon, Indiana, Utah, and La Salle respectively won the tournament.

Dale Hall was named a consensus All-American as well as the Sporting News National Player of the Year.  Other players of note on the team included Doug Kenna '45, John Hennessey '44 (who served with the 70th Infantry Division in World War II and ultimately retired as a general officer), Robert Faas '44 (who flew in the Pacific theater as a P-47N pilot in the waning days of World War II), and Edward C. Christl '44, who was awarded a posthumous Distinguished Service Cross and for whom Army's Christl Arena is named.

Schedule and results

|-
!colspan=9 style="background:#000000; color:#D6C499;"| Regular season

Source

References

Army Black Knights men's basketball seasons
NCAA Division I men's basketball tournament championship seasons
Army
Army Cadets Men's Basketball Team
Army Cadets Men's Basketball Team